Marie-Angèle Duval (pseudonym Añjela Duval; 3 April 1905, in Le Vieux-Marché – 7 November 1981, in Lannion) was a French writer and poet of Breton literature, best remembered for her works Kan an douar (1973), Traoñ an Dour (1982), Tad-kozh Roperz-Huon (1822-1902) (1982), and Me, Anjela (1986).

References 

1905 births
1981 deaths
French writers
French poets